This is a list of 188 species in Geron, a genus of bee flies in the family Bombyliidae.

Geron species

 Geron aaptis Evenhuis, 1979 c g
 Geron ablusus Bowden, 1974 c g
 Geron aequalis Painter, 1932 i c g
 Geron aesion Evenhuis, 1979 c g
 Geron africanus Evenhuis & Greathead, 1999 c g
 Geron albarius Painter, 1932 i c g
 Geron albescens Brunetti, 1909 c g
 Geron albidipennis Loew, 1869 i c g
 Geron albidus Walker, 1857 c g
 Geron albifacies Bezzi, 1924 c g
 Geron albihalteris Evenhuis, 1979 c g
 Geron albipilosus Hall & Evenhuis, 2003 c g
 Geron albus Cole, 1923 i c g
 Geron amboinensis Evenhuis, 1979 c g
 Geron anceps Hesse, 1938 c g
 Geron anomalus (Hesse, 1938) c
 Geron arenicola Painter, 1932 i c g
 Geron argentifrons Brunetti, 1909 c g
 Geron argutus Painter, 1932 i c g
 Geron aridus Painter, 1932 i c g
 Geron articulatus Scarbrough, 1985 c g
 Geron asiaticus Zaitzev, 1967 c g
 Geron auratus Zaitzev, 1962 c g
 Geron auricomus Hall, 1976 c g
 Geron australis Macquart, 1840 c g
 Geron balpi Evenhuis, 1979 c g
 Geron barbatus Bezzi, 1921 c g
 Geron basutoensis (Hesse, 1938) c
 Geron bechuanus Hesse, 1936 c g
 Geron bezzii (Paramonov, 1930) c
 Geron binatus Scarbrough, 1985 c g
 Geron borealis Hall & Evenhuis, 2003 c g
 Geron bowdeni Evenhuis, 1979 c g
 Geron cabon Evenhuis, 1979 c g
 Geron calvus Loew, 1863 i c g b
 Geron candidulus Bowden, 1974 c g
 Geron canescens Zaitzev, 1962 c g
 Geron canus Philippi, 1865 c g
 Geron capensis Walker, 1852 c g
 Geron capicolus (Hesse, 1938) c g
 Geron cheilicterus (Hesse, 1938) c g
 Geron chrysonotum Evenhuis, 1979 c g
 Geron colei Evenhuis, 1978 i
 Geron confusus Hall & Evenhuis, 2003 c g
 Geron consors (Hesse, 1938) c g
 Geron cressoni Hall & Evenhuis, 2003 c g
 Geron curvipennis Zaitzev, 1972 c g
 Geron dasycerus (Hesse, 1938) c g
 Geron declinatus Scarbrough, 1985 c g
 Geron delicatus Hesse, 1938 c g
 Geron dicronus Bigot, 1892 c g
 Geron digitarius Cresson, 1919 i c g
 Geron dilutus Bowden, 1974 c g
 Geron dispar Macquart, 1850 c g
 Geron disparilis (Hesse, 1938) c
 Geron dissors Hesse, 1938 c g
 Geron dubiosus Hesse, 1938 c g
 Geron efflatouni Greathead, 1999 c g
 Geron elachys Hall & Evenhuis, 2003 c g
 Geron emiliae Zaitzev, 1964 c g
 Geron eriogonae Hall & Evenhuis, 2003 c g
 Geron erythroccipitalis Evenhuis, 1979 c g
 Geron erythropus Bezzi, 1925 c g
 Geron europacificus Evenhuis, 1979 c g
 Geron exemptus Bowden, 1974 c g
 Geron exumae Scarbrough, 1985 c g
 Geron farri Scarbrough, 1985 c g
 Geron flavocciput Evenhuis, 1979 c g
 Geron freidbergi Zaitzev, 1996 c g
 Geron fumipennis Evenhuis, 1979 c g
 Geron furcifer Hesse, 1938 c g
 Geron fuscipes (Hesse, 1938) c g
 Geron fusciscelis Evenhuis, 1979 c g
 Geron garagniae Efflatoun, 1945 c g
 Geron gariepinus Hesse, 1938 c g
 Geron gibbosus (Olivier, 1789) c g
 Geron gilloni Lachaise & Bowden, 1976 c g
 Geron grandis Painter, 1932 i c g
 Geron griseus Zaitzev, 1962 c g
 Geron halli Hall & Evenhuis, 2003 c g
 Geron halteralis Wiedemann, 1820 c g
 Geron hemifuscis Evenhuis, 1979 c g
 Geron hesperidum Frey, 1936 c g
 Geron hessei Bowden, 1974 c g
 Geron heteropterus (Wiedemann, 1821) c g
 Geron holosericeus Walker, 1849 i c g
 Geron hybus Coquillett, 1894 i c g
 Geron inflatus Evenhuis, 1979 c g
 Geron infrequens Hall & Evenhuis, 2003 c g
 Geron intonsus Bezzi, 1925 c g
 Geron johnsoni Painter, 1932 i c g
 Geron juxtus Bowden, 1974 c g
 Geron karakara Evenhuis, 1979 c g
 Geron karooanus (Hesse, 1938) c g
 Geron kazabi Zaitzev, 1972 c g
 Geron kerzhneri Zaitzev, 1975 c g
 Geron kozlovi Zaitzev, 1972 c g
 Geron krymensis Paramonov, 1929 c g
 Geron lactipennis Hesse, 1938 c g
 Geron lasiocornis (Hesse, 1938) c g
 Geron latifrons Hesse, 1938 c g
 Geron lepidus Bowden, 1962 c g
 Geron leptocerus Bezzi, 1921 c g
 Geron litoralis Painter, 1932 i c g
 Geron longiventris Efflatoun, 1945 c g
 Geron luctuosus Bezzi, 1921 c g
 Geron macquarti Greathead, 1999 c g
 Geron maculifacies Hesse, 1938 c g
 Geron malekulanus Evenhuis, 1979 c g
 Geron marius Bowden, 1980 c g
 Geron marshalli (Hesse, 1938) c g
 Geron meigeni Greathead, 2001 c g
 Geron michaili Zaitzev, 1972 c g
 Geron mononensis Evenhuis, 1979 c g
 Geron mononesensis Evenhuis, 1979 c g
 Geron montanus (Hesse, 1938) c g
 Geron monticola Hall & Evenhuis, 2003 c g
 Geron munroi Hesse, 1938 c g
 Geron mystacinus Bezzi, 1924 c g
 Geron mysticus Evenhuis, 1979 c g
 Geron namaensis (Hesse, 1938) c
 Geron nasutus Bezzi, 1924 c g
 Geron nephroideus Scarbrough, 1985 c g
 Geron neromelanus (Hesse, 1938) c g
 Geron neutralis Evenhuis, 1979 c g
 Geron nevadensis Hall & Evenhuis, 2003 c g
 Geron nigerrimus Hesse, 1938 c g
 Geron nigralis Roberts, 1929 c g
 Geron nigrifacies Hesse, 1938 c g
 Geron nigrifemoris (Hesse, 1938) c
 Geron nigripes Painter, 1932 i c g
 Geron nigrocciput Evenhuis, 1979 c g
 Geron niveolus Evenhuis & Greathead, 1999 c g
 Geron niveus Cresson, 1919 i c g
 Geron nomadicus Hesse, 1938 c g
 Geron notios Hall & Evenhuis, 2003 c g
 Geron nudus Painter, 1932 i c g
 Geron olivierii Macquart, 1840 c g
 Geron opacus Bowden, 1971 c g
 Geron orthoperus Hesse, 1938 c g
 Geron painteri Hall & Evenhuis, 2003 c g
 Geron pallipilosus Yang & Yang, 1992 c g
 Geron paramonovi Evenhuis, 1979 c g
 Geron paraustralicus Evenhuis, 1979 c g
 Geron parvidus Painter, 1932 i c g
 Geron parvus Hesse, 1938 c g
 Geron peringueyi (Hesse, 1938) c g
 Geron peucon Hall & Evenhuis, 2003 c g
 Geron phallophorus Bezzi, 1920 c g
 Geron philippinensis Evenhuis & Arakaki, 1980 c g
 Geron priapeus Bezzi, 1920 c g
 Geron prosopidis Hall & Evenhuis, 2003 c g
 Geron psammobates Hesse, 1938 c g
 Geron ritae Zaitzev, 1996 c g
 Geron robertsi Evenhuis, 1979 c g
 Geron roborovskii Zaitzev, 1996 c g
 Geron robustus Cresson, 1919 i
 Geron rufipes Macquart, 1846 i c g
 Geron saccharus Bowden, 1974 c g
 Geron salmonus Scarbrough & Davidson, 1985 c g
 Geron samarus Bowden, 1974 c g
 Geron semifuscus Seguy, 1933 c g
 Geron senilis (Fabricius, 1794) i c
 Geron seychellarum Greathead, 1983 c g
 Geron simplex Walker, 1858 c g
 Geron simplicipennis Greathead, 1967 c g
 Geron sinensis Yang & Yang, 1992 c g
 Geron smirnovi Zaitzev, 1978 c g
 Geron snowi Painter, 1932 i c g
 Geron sparsus Bowden, 1971 c g
 Geron stenos Hall & Evenhuis, 2003 c g
 Geron subauratus Loew, 1863 i c g
 Geron subflavofemoratus Andreu Rubio, 1959 c g
 Geron syriacus Zaitzev, 2002 c g
 Geron tenue Walker, 1857 c g
 Geron terminatus Evenhuis, 1979 c g
 Geron transvaalensis Hesse, 1938 c g
 Geron turneri Hesse, 1938 c g
 Geron umbripennis Bezzi, 1924 c g
 Geron validus Evenhuis, 1989 c g
 Geron varicapillis Bowden, 1974 c g
 Geron viaticus Bowden, 1974 c g
 Geron victolgae Zaitzev, 2004 c g
 Geron vitripennis Loew, 1869 i c g b
 Geron waltoni (Hesse, 1938) c
 Geron weemsi Hall & Evenhuis, 2003 c g
 Geron westralicus Evenhuis, 1979 c g
 Geron winburni Painter, 1932 i c g

Data sources: i = ITIS, c = Catalogue of Life, g = GBIF, b = Bugguide.net

References

Geron
Articles created by Qbugbot